Charles Phillips Dorr (August 12, 1852 – October 8, 1914) was a lawyer and Republican politician from West Virginia who served as a United States representative in the 55th United States Congress. Dorr was born in Miltonsburg, Ohio, in Monroe County.

Dorr moved with his parents to Woodsfield, Ohio, in 1866. He taught school in Ohio and West Virginia. After studying law, he was admitted to the bar in 1874 and began practicing in West Virginia that year. He was a member of the Webster Springs, West Virginia town council. He won election to the fourth delegate district of the West Virginia House of Delegates in 1884 and 1888. In 1887 he was made Sergeant at Arms. He won election in 1896 to the Fifty-fifth Congress (March 4, 1897 – March 3, 1899). He was not a candidate for renomination in 1898 and resumed his legal practice at Webster Springs, West Virginia. He died on his estate at Clover Lick, West Virginia, in Pocahontas County on October 8, 1914. He was buried at Clover Lick Cemetery.

See also
United States congressional delegations from West Virginia

Sources

 Online. September 11, 2007.

1852 births
1914 deaths
People from Monroe County, Ohio
Republican Party members of the United States House of Representatives from West Virginia
19th-century American politicians
People from Woodsfield, Ohio
People from Webster Springs, West Virginia
19th-century American lawyers